Arthur Farh  (born 12 June 1972 in Monrovia) is a Liberian retired professional footballer who played for several clubs in Europe, including Stade Rennais F.C., Stuttgarter Kickers and FC Homburg as well as the Liberia national football team.

International career
Farh made several appearances for the full Liberia national team, including four qualifying matches for the 1990 FIFA World Cup. He played for Liberia at the 1996 African Cup of Nations finals in South Africa.

Drug smuggling arrest
Farh acquired German citizenship while he was playing football in the country, but moved to the United Kingdom after he retired from playing. In January 2011, Farh was charged with drug smuggling after arriving at London Heathrow Airport on a flight from Sint Maarten with cocaine worth £40,000.

References

External links

Profile at Kickersarchiv.de

1972 births
Living people
Sportspeople from Monrovia
Liberian footballers
Association football forwards
Liberia international footballers
1996 African Cup of Nations players
Ligue 1 players
Stade Rennais F.C. players
Grenoble Foot 38 players
Stuttgarter Kickers players
FC 08 Homburg players
SV Wilhelmshaven players
Liberian expatriate footballers
Liberian expatriate sportspeople in France
Expatriate footballers in France
Liberian expatriate sportspeople in Germany
Expatriate footballers in Germany